Samuel Mardian, Jr. (June 24, 1919 – November 23, 2015) was an American businessman and politician.

Mardian was an American Republican politician, and the  Mayor of Phoenix from 1960 until 1964.

Biography 
Mardian attended Southwestern University.

Mardian was born in Pasadena, California, the son of Armenian immigrants Akabe (née Lekerian) and Samuel Mardian, Sr. He served as a captain in the United States Army Air Forces during World War II. From 1960 to 1964, Mardian served as the Mayor of Phoenix, Arizona. Mardian was an older brother of Watergate figure Robert Mardian. He helped operated his family's construction enterprise and was an accountant.

Sam Mardian died in Phoenix, Arizona on November 23, 2015, at the age of 96.

Awards and honors
 Distinguished Achievement Award, 1980, Arizona State University W. P. Carey School of Business
 Man of the Year, 1982, Valley Leadership

References

 Who's Who in the World, 1974–1975 by Marquis Who's Who, Second edition (Wilmette, IL, 1973)
 Armenian–American veterans of World War II by Armenian General Benevolent Union (New York, 1951)

External links

 Official Site of the City of Phoenix – Gallery of Mayors
 ASU W. P. Carey School of Business Distinguished Achievement Award Recipients
 Political Graveyard

1919 births
2015 deaths
American people of Armenian descent
People from Pasadena, California
Mayors of Phoenix, Arizona
Businesspeople from Arizona
Arizona Republicans
Armenian American
20th-century American businesspeople